Colorblind is an album by Robert Randolph & the Family Band. It is the group's second studio album.

Track listing
 "Ain't Nothing Wrong With That" (Andrew Ramsey, Robert Randolph, Shannon Sanders) - 3:30
 "Deliver Me" (Robert Randolph, Gary Nicholson, Tommy Sims) – 4:30
 "Diane" (Mark Batson, Robert Randolph) – 3:28
 "Angels" (Mark Batson, Robert Randolph, Shannon Sanders, David J. Matthews) – 4:02
 "Jesus Is Just Alright" (Arthur S. Reynolds) – 5:26
 "Stronger" (Robert Randolph, Steve McEwan, Danyel Morgan, Jason Crosby) – 4:10
 "Thrill of It" (Robert Randolph, Danyel Morgan, Marcus Randolph, Jeff Trott, Jason Crosby) – 3:28
 "Blessed" (Robert Randolph, Tommy Sims, Lenesha Randolph) – 3:45
 "Love Is the Only Way" (Mark Batson, David J. Matthews) – 4:24
 "Thankful 'N Thoughtful" (Sylvester Stewart)– 3:43
 "Homecoming" (Andrew Ramsey, Robert Randolph, Shannon Sanders) – 3:51
 "Do Yourself a Favor" (iTunes bonus track) – 8:40

Personnel

Album line-up 
 Robert Randolph - pedal steel guitar (tracks 1, 11), guitars (2, 3, 4, 5, 6, 7, 8, 9, 10), lead vocals (1, 2, 8, 11), background vocals (1, 11), vocals (2, 3, 4, 5, 6, 7, 8, 9)
 Danyel Morgan - bass (all tracks), lead vocals (1, 10, 11), background vocals (1, 2, 11), vocals (2, 3, 4, 5, 6, 7, 8, 9), stomps, claps (1)
 Marcus Randolph - drums (all tracks), stomps, claps (1), background vocals (11)
 Jason Crosby - keyboards (tracks 1, 11), Hammond organ (2, 3, 4, 5, 6, 7, 8, 9, 10), piano (2, 3, 4, 5, 6, 7, 8, 9, 10), stomps, claps (1), background vocals (11)

Guest appearances 
 Mark Batson - drum programming (tracks 3, 4, 9), keyboards (4, 9)
 Eric Clapton - guitars, vocals (track 5)
 Shanna Crook - background vocals (track 1)
 Leela James - vocals (track 6)
 Dave Matthews - guitar, vocals (track 9)
 Steve McKuen - acoustic guitar (track 6)
 LeRoi Moore - tenor saxophone (tracks 3, 9)
 Drew Ramsey - guitar, background vocals (tracks 1, 11), stomps, claps (1)
 Lenesha Randolph - background vocals (tracks 1, 2, 4, 8)
 Rashawn Ross - trumpet (tracks 3, 9)
 Shannon Sanders - keyboards (tracks 1, 11), background vocals (1, 4, 11), stomps, claps (1)
 Tommy Sims - background vocals (track 2, 8)

Production
Bruce Flohr  – A&R
Serban Ghenea  – Mixing
Liza Joseph  – Coordination, A&R
Tom Whalley  – Executive Producer

References

2006 albums
Robert Randolph and the Family Band albums
Warner Records albums